= Springs Spree =

Music festival in Colorado, United States

Springs Spree is an outdoor music festival in Colorado Springs, Colorado. In addition to live music, the event also has a food truck competition, carnival-style rides and attractions, a civic village, a 5k run, and a beer garden.

== Public Relations ==
Springs Spree – specifically its 5k race – has partnered with Shield 616, a police gear supplier. A controversy arose in 2015 as to whether or not Planned Parenthood could set up a booth at the festival.
